Bewley may refer to:

People 
Bewley is a surname of English origin which may derive from the French name Beaulieu. Notable people with the surname include:

Anthony Bewley (1804-1860), American abolitionist pastor lynched for his views
Beulah Bewley (1929–2018), British physician
Brett Bewley (born 1995), Australian footballer
Carole A. Bewley, American scientist
Charles Bewley (1888–1969), Irish diplomat
Charlie Bewley (born 1981), British actor
Edmund  Thomas Bewley (1837-1908), Irish judge
Janet Bewley (Wisconsin politician) (born 1951), American politician
Lydia Rose Bewley (born 1985), British actress
Randall Bewley (1955–2009), American guitarist
Sam Bewley (born 1987), New Zealand cyclist
Susan Bewley, British obstetrician, daughter of Beulah
Truman Bewley (born 1941), American economist
William Bewley (1726–1783), British physician
William Bewley (New York politician) (1878–1953), American politician

Places 
Bewley Common, a hamlet in Wiltshire, England
Cowpen Bewley, a village in Durham, England
Newton Bewley, a village in Durham, England

Other uses
Bewley's, an Irish beverage company

See also
Beaulieu (disambiguation)
Beauly

Surnames of British Isles origin